Leopoldine von Sternberg (Maria Leopoldine Walburga Eva; 11 December 1733, Vienna – 1 March 1809, Valtice) was a princess consort of Liechtenstein by marriage to Prince Franz Joseph I. She is noted to have belonged to the discussion circle of Eleonore of Liechtenstein, who acted as political advisers to Emperor Joseph II.

Life
She was the daughter of Count Franz Philipp of Sternberg and Countess Leopoldine of Starhemberg. Marie Leopoldine married Franz Joseph I, Prince of Liechtenstein, on 6 July 1750 in Valtice or Feldsberg.

After the death of her spouse in 1781, she lived permanently in Vienna with her youngest daughter, Maria Josepha Hermenegilde.

She belonged to the salon or discussion circle of five princesses, headed by Eleonore of Liechtenstein, who acted as the political advisers of Emperor Joseph II, and who met him once a week (four times a week after 1780) to discuss state affairs. This circle consisted of Princess Eleonore of Liechtenstein (1745-1812), Princess Maria Josepha von Clary und Aldringen (1728-1801), Princess Maria Sidonia Kinsky von Wchinitz und Tettau (1729-1815), Countess Leopoldine von Sternberg (1733-1809), Count Franz Moritz von Lacy (1725-1801) who was Austrian field marshal and the chief treasury Prince Franz Xaver Wolfgang von Orsini-Rosenberg (1723-1796).

Issue
The couple had eight children: 
 Joseph Franz de Paula Emanuel Philipp Isaias (Vienna, 6 July 1752 – Vienna, 17 February 1754)
 Leopoldina Maria Anna Francisca de Paula Adelgunda (Vienna, 30 January 1754 – Frankfurt, 16 October 1823), married in Felsberg on 1 September 1771 Karl Emanuel, Landgrave of Hesse-Rheinfels-Rotenburg, and had issue (including Victor Amadeus, Landgrave of Hesse-Rotenburg)
 Maria Antonia Aloysia Walburga Mechthildis (Vienna, 14 March 1756 – Vienna, 1 December 1821), a nun
 Franz de Paula Joseph (Vienna, 19 May 1758 – Vienna, 15 August 1760)
 Aloys I, Prince of Liechtenstein (1759–1805)
 Johann I Joseph, Prince of Liechtenstein (1760–1836)
 Philipp Joseph Aloys Martinianus (Vienna, 2 July 1762 – Vienna, 18 May 1802), unmarried and without issue
 Maria Josepha Hermenegilde (Vienna, 13 April 1768 – Hütteldorf, 8 August 1845), married in Vienna on 15 September 1783 Nikolaus 7te Fürst Esterházy von Galántha (Vienna, 12 December 1765 – Como, 24 November 1833), and had issue

Ancestry

References 

 Adam Wolf: Fürstin Eleonore Liechtenstein, 1745–1812, nach Briefen und Memoiren ihrer Zeit. Wien 1875 
 Jacob von Falke: Geschichte des fürstlichen Hauses Liechtenstein. 3. Band, Wien 1882.
 Raoul Auernheimer: Metternich. Staatsmann und Kavalier. München 1977, S. 37 f.
 Günther Ebersold: August Reichsfürst von Bretzenheim. Norderstedt 2004, S. 242 ff.
 Derek Beales: Joseph II. 2 Bände, Cambridge University Press 1987/2009, vor allem Band 1, S. 324–337, Abbildung 17a, Band 2, S. 20–25. 
 Rebecca Gates-Coon: The Charmed Circle. Joseph II and the "Five Princesses," 1765–1790. Purdue University Press, West Lafayette, Indiana 2015, unter anderem S. 2 (Abbildung), 120–127, 343 f. (heutiger Standort der archivalischen Quellen).

1733 births
1809 deaths
Princely consorts of Liechtenstein
Nobility from Vienna
Leopoldine
18th-century Liechtenstein women
19th-century Liechtenstein women
Burials in Vienna